Cryptotrema corallinum, the deep-water blenny, is a species of labrisomid blenny native to the eastern Pacific Ocean where it is known to occur from Santa Cruz Island, California to Baja California, Mexico. This species can reach a length of  TL.

References

corallinum
Fish described in 1890